At Weddings is the debut studio album by American musician Tomberlin. It was released on August 10, 2018 under Saddle Creek Records.

Critical reception
At Weddings was met with "universal acclaim" reviews from critics. At Metacritic, which assigns a weighted average rating out of 100 to reviews from mainstream publications, this release received an average score of 82 based on 14 reviews. Aggregator Album of the Year gave the release a 80 out of 100 based on a critical consensus of 17 reviews.

Writing on behalf of AllMusic, Marcy Donelson said: "Tomberlin's brittle vocals are accompanied mainly by acoustic guitar with touches of keyboards and strings on an album that features performances by only the songwriter and producer Owen Pallett." Chris Gee of Exclaim! explains how Tomberlin navigates her new release "with little more than guitar, keyboards and a reverberating soft power that meticulously frees herself from the burden of a defined path." At The Line of Best Fit, Craig Howieson explains: "Guarded and beautifully measured, At Weddings has an absorbingly intimate quality. Lonesome reverberating guitars ricochet off the sparse percussion while tempered piano lines chime and assuage. Whether it be the swathes of white noise on "Tornado", the yowl of feedback on "Self-Help" or the rudimental piano line on sublime opener "Any Other Way" each embellishment hangs as if it were a carefully placed decoration. Above all of this Tomberlin's voice shines as the warm heart of the record."

Accolades

Tracklist

Personnel

Musicians
 Sarah Beth Tomberlin – primary artist, vocals, guitar

Production
 Owen Pallett – engineer, mixing, producer
 Paul Gold – mastering

References

2018 debut albums
Saddle Creek Records albums